Antequera acertella is a moth in the family Cosmopterigidae. It was described by August Busck in 1913. It is found in California and Baja California.

References

Natural History Museum Lepidoptera generic names catalog

Moths described in 1913
Antequerinae
Moths of North America